Rijnders is a surname. Notable people with the surname include:

Anke Rijnders (born 1956), Dutch swimmer
Nico Rijnders, (1947–1976) Dutch footballer
Roderick Rijnders, Dutch rower
Dirk Rijnders, (1909–2006) Dutch politician
 

Dutch-language surnames
Patronymic surnames